The classification of urban-formatted radio stations range from the radio formats of rhythmic contemporary hit radio to Urban contemporary gospel. Though urban contemporary was the originator of the format, there have come to be many variations of the format in the last 30 years.

Alabama

Birmingham
 WAGG/WENN – Heaven 610 WAGG – Urban contemporary gospel
 WATV – V-94.9 – Urban contemporary
 WJLD – AM 1400 WJLD – Urban oldies/Blues
 WBHJ – 95.7 Jamz – Rhythmic contemporary hit radio (Urban contemporary hit radio)
 WBHK – 98.7 Kiss FM – Urban adult contemporary
 WMJJ-HD2 – 104.1 The Beat – Mainstream urban
 WUHT – Hot 107.7 – Urban adult contemporary
 WUHT-HD2 – Old-school hip hop
 WERC-HD2  – Hallelujah 105.1 – Urban contemporary gospel
 WERC-HD3  – B106.5 – Urban adult contemporary
 WDXB-HD2/W224CK - Birmingham’s BIN 92.7 - Black-oriented news

Mobile
 WGOK – Gospel 900 – Urban contemporary gospel
 WBLX-FM – 93BLX – Urban contemporary
 WDLT-FM – 104.1 WDLT – Urban adult contemporary
 WRGV - 107.3 The Beat - Mainstream urban
 WMXC-HD2 - 100.3 Hallelujah FM - Urban Gospel
 WZEW HD-3 - 92.5 The Soul Of Mobile - Urban Oldies
 WASG - AM 540 - Urban gospel
 WERM - Gospel 1220 - Urban gospel

Huntsville
 WDJL – Gospel Explosions 1000 AM – Urban Gospel
 WEUP – Worship 94.5 – Urban contemporary gospel and urban adult contemporary
 WEUV – Worship 94.5 - simulcasts WEUP (AM) – Urban contemporary gospel and urban adult contemporary
 WHIY – AM 1600 Party Oldies & Blues – Urban Oldies, Blues
 WEUP-FM – 103.1 WEUP – Mainstream urban
 WEUZ – 92.1 simulcasts WEUP-FM – Mainstream urban
 WHRP – 94.1 WHRP – Urban adult contemporary
 WLOR/WAHR HD-2 - 98.1 The Beat - Urban Contemporary

Montgomery
 WXVI – Sonshine 16 – Urban contemporary gospel
 WHLW – Hallelujah 104.3 – Urban contemporary gospel
 WJWZ – 97.9 Jamz – Urban contemporary
 WKXN/WZKD – The Big KD – Urban adult contemporary
 WWMG – Magic 97.1 – Urban adult contemporary
 WZHT – Hot 105.7 – Mainstream urban
 WQKS-HD2 – Yo! 100.5 – Classic hip-hop
 WMRK-HD3 - Praise 96.5 - Urban Gospel
 WMRK-HD2/W257DS - Montgomery’s BIN 99.3 - Black-oriented news

Tuscaloosa
 WTSK – Praise 93.3 - Urban contemporary gospel
 WMXB – Mix 107.3 – Urban Adult Contemporary
 WWPG – Q-104 – Urban oldies
 WTUG-FM – 92.9 WTUG – Urban adult contemporary
 WALJ – 105.1 The Block – Mainstream urban

Dothan
 WDSA – AM 1320 – Urban Talk
 WAGF-FM – 101.3 The Touch – Urban adult contemporary/Urban contemporary gospel
 WBBK-FM – Magic 93.1 – Urban adult contemporary
 WJJN – 92.1 Jamz – Urban contemporary
 WARB - Vibe 105.9 - Urban contemporary

Florence/Muscle Shoals
 WZZA - AM 1410 The Soul Of The Shoals - Urban Adult Contemporary, Blues

Selma
 WJAM - Jammin' 94.7 FM & 1340 AM - Urban Adult Contemporary
 WBFZ - Z-105.3 - Urban Contemporary/Urban Gospel

Anniston/Oxford
 WFZX - 99.1 & 99.3 The Vibe - Urban contemporary
 WHOG - 93.5 The Hog - Urban adult contemporary

Pine Hill
 WKXK - The Big KD - Urban adult contemporary

Gadsden
 WMGJ - Magic 1240 AM - Urban contemporary

Demopolis
 WZNJ/WXAL - 106.5 The River - Urban contemporary/Urban oldies

Livingston
 WYLS - Rejoice WYLS - Black gospel

Brantley
 WXKD - The Big KD - Urban adult contemporary

Alaska

Anchorage
 KFAT – K-Fat 929 – Rhythmic contemporary hit radio/Hip-Hop

Arizona

Phoenix
 KAJM – Mega 104.3 – Rhythmic/Urban oldies
 KKFR – Power 98.3 & 96.1 – Rhythmic contemporary hit radio/Hip hop
 KMVA/KZON - Hot 97.5/103.9 - Rhythmic Hot AC
 KZCE – 101.1 The Bounce  – Classic Hip Hop
 KQMR/KHOV-FM - Latino Mix 100.3/105.1 - Spanish rhythmic
 KRDP - Radio Phoenix 90.7 - Urban Contemporary, Blues, Jazz, Community Radio

Tucson
 KTGV – 106.3 The Groove – Rhythmic/Urban Oldies
 KOHT – Hot 98.3 – Urban contemporary
 KSZR - 97.5 The Vibe - Classic hip hop
 KMMA - Mega 97.1 - Spanish CHR
 KZLZ-HD2/KLPX-HD3 - 92.5 Urbana - Spanish rhythmic

Arkansas

Little Rock
 KIPR/KFOG – Power 92 Jams – Urban contemporary
 KHTE-FM - 96.5 The Box - Urban contemporary
 KOKY – 102.1 KOKY – Urban adult contemporary
 KPZK – Praise 102.5 – Urban contemporary gospel
 KZTS - Rejoice 1380/105.5/103.3 - Urban Gospel
 KWCP-LP - KWCP-LP 98.9 The Mix - Urban Adult Contemporary/Classic Hip Hop

Pine Bluff
 KPBA - 99.3 The Beat - Mainstream Urban
 KCAT – The Cat 92.7 FM & 1340 AM – Urban Oldies
 KUAP – Hot 89.7 – Urban Contemporary/College Radio

Texarkana
 KTFS - KTOY Gospel Radio 105.9 - Urban Gospel
 KTOY – 104.7 KTOY – Urban adult contemporary
 KZRB – B-103.5 – Mainstream urban
 KMJI – Majic 93.3 – Urban contemporary

Blytheville
 KAMJ – K Jam 93-9 – Mainstream urban

Fayetteville
 KQIS - Kiss 105.3/1340 - Mainstream Urban
 KDIV-LP - KDIV 98.7 - Urban Contemporary/Community Radio
 KXVB - 101.5 The Vibe - Rhythmic Contemporary/Classic Hip Hop

El Dorado/Camden
 KMLK – "FM 98.7" – Urban contemporary
 KMGC – "Magic 104.5" – Urban adult contemporary

Jonesboro
 KDXY-HD2 - "Hot 107.5" - Rhythmic Top 40

California

Los Angeles
 KPWR – Power 106 – Rhythmic Hot AC
 KRRL – Real 92.3 – Urban contemporary 
 KRRL-HD2 - Black Information Network - Black-oriented news
 KTWV – 94.7 The Wave – Urban Adult Contemporary/Rhythmic Adult Contemporary
 KTWV-HD2 – Wave Classics – Smooth jazz
 KJLH – 102.3 KJLH – Urban adult contemporary
 KDAY – 93.5 KDAY – Classic hip hop
 KLLI - Cali 93.9 - Spanish rhythmic
 KBLA - 1580 KBLA - Urban/Progressive Talk
 KXOL-FM - Mega 96.3 - Spanish CHR

San Francisco/Oakland/San Jose
 KDYA – Gospel 1190 the Light – Urban contemporary gospel
 KBLX – 102.9 KBLX – Urban adult contemporary
KBLX HD-2 - Old School 102.9 HD-2 - Urban Oldies
KBLX HD-3 - Praise Bay Area - Urban Gospel
 KMEL – 106 KMEL – Urban contemporary
 KMEL-HD2 – Xtreme Hip hop
 KKSF - The Bay Area’s BIN 910 - Black-oriented news
 KRBQ – 102 JAMS – Classic Hip Hop
 KVVF/KVVZ - Latino Mix 105.7/100.7 - Spanish rhythmic

San Diego
 XHRM-FM – Magic 92.5 – Rhythmic AC
 KSSX - Jam'n 95.7 – Rhythmic contemporary
 KSSX-HD2 - Black Information Network - Black-oriented news
 XHRST-FM - Mas Flo 107.7 - Latin urban

Sacramento
 KDEE-LP – 97.5 – Urban adult contemporary/Community radio
 KHYL – V 101 – Classic hip-hop
 KSFM – 102.5 KSFM – Rhythmic contemporary
 KHHM - Fuego 101.9 - Bilingual Rhythmic CHR

Riverside/San Bernardino
 KDEY-FM – 93.5 KDAY – Classic hip hop
 KGGI – 99.1 KGGI – Rhythmic Top 40
 KQIE – Old School 104.7 – Rhythmic Oldies
 KFOO - Riverside’s BIN 1440 - Black-oriented news

Bakersfield
 KKBB – Groove 99.3 – Rhythmic Oldies
 KISV – HOT 94.1 – Rhythmic Top 40
 KVPM - Precious 95.7 - Urban Contemporary
 KBDS - Forge 103.9 - Rhythmic contemporary hit radio

Palmdale/Ridgecrest/High Desert
 KRAJ – 100.9 The Heat - Rhythmic Top 40

Stockton
 KWIN – 97.7 and 98.3 K-WIN – Urban contemporary
 KQOD – Mega 100.1 – Rhythmic oldies

Modesto
 KWNN – 97.7 and 98.3 K-WIN – Urban contemporary
 KHTN - Hot 104.7 - Rhythmic Top 40
 KCVR-FM - Fuego 98.9 - Bilingual Rhythmic CHR

Palm Springs
 KKUU – U-92.7 – Rhythmic contemporary
 KMRJ - Jammin 99.5 - Rhythmic AC
 KPST-FM - Fuego 103.5 - Bilingual Rhythmic CHR

Santa Barbara/Santa Maria/San Luis Obispo
 KWWV – Wild 106.1 – Rhythmic Top 40
 KRTO - Fuego 97.1 - Hispanic rhythmic
 KOSJ - Old School 94.1 & 1490 - Rhythmic oldies

Oxnard/Ventura County
 KCAQ – Q95.9 – Rhythmic Top 40
 KOCP - Old School 104.7 - Rhythmic Oldies

Monterey/Salinas
 KDON – 102.5 K-Don – Rhythmic Top 40 (CHR)
 KOCN – K-Ocean 105.1 – Rhythmic/Urban oldies

Fresno
 KBOS – B95 – Rhythmic contemporary
 KMGV – Mega 97.9 – Rhythmic Oldies
 KFBT – 103.7 The Beat – Rhythmic adult contemporary
 KSEQ – Q97 – Rhythmic Top 40
 KOKO-FM - Jammin' 94.3 - Rhythmic/Urban Oldies
 KBHH - Forge 95.3 - Rhythmic contemporary hit radio

Victorville
 KATJ HD-2 - HD-96.3 - Rhythmic Contemporary/Hip Hop

Barstow
 KWIE - Old School 101.3 - Rhythmic oldies

Chico
 KZSZ-HD2 - 107.9 Urbana - Spanish rhythmic

Santa Rosa
 KSXY-HD2 - Latino 95.5 - Spanish CHR

Colorado

Denver
 KJHM – Jammin' 101.5 – Urban Adult Contemporary
 KQKS – KS107.5 – Rhythmic contemporary hit radio
 KUVO HD-2 - The Drop 104.7 & 89.3 HD-2 - Urban Contemporary
 KFCO - Flo 107.1 - Classic Hip Hop

Colorado Springs
 KIBT – 96.1 The Beat – Rhythmic Top 40
KIBT HD-2 - Urban Oldies

Fort Collins
 KARS-FM - Power 102.9 - Rhythmic Top 40/Hip Hop
 KJMP - Jump 104.5 - Classic Hip Hop

Connecticut

Hartford/New Haven
 WKND – The Power 97.5 FM & AM 1480 – Urban adult contemporary (Hartford)
 WQTQ - Qute 89.9 - Urban Contemporary (Hartford)
 WYBC-FM – 94.3 WYBC – Urban adult contemporary (New Haven)
 WKCI-HD2 - 100.9 The Beat - Mainstream urban (New Haven)
 WZMX – Hot 93.7 – Rhythmic contemporary (Hartford/New Haven)
 WBOM - 102.5 Hartford's R&B Station - Urban Adult Contemporary (Meriden/Hartford)
 WLAT - La Mega 101.7 - Spanish tropical
 WMRQ-HD2 - Bomba FM - Spanish tropical (Hartford/Meriden)

New London
 WWRX – Jammin' 107.7 Rhythmic contemporary hit radio
 WDUP-LP - 92.9 FM WDUP Timeless Hip Hop and R&B - Urban Adult Contemporary

Bloomfield
 WGZO-LP - Heartbeat 98.7 - Urban gospel

Delaware

Wilmington
 WXHL-FM - Reach Gospel Radio 89.1 - Urban gospel

District of Columbia

Washington
 WOL – News Talk 1450 - Urban News/Talk
 WYCB – Spirit 1340 – Urban contemporary gospel
 WPRS-FM – Praise 104.1 – Urban contemporary gospel
 WHUR – 96.3 WHUR – Urban adult contemporary
 WKYS – 93.9 Kiss FM – Mainstream urban
 WMMJ/WDCJ – Majic 102.3 & 92.7 – Urban adult contemporary
 WPGC-FM – WPGC 95.5 – Urban Contemporary
 WUST/WMZQ-HD2 - DMV’s BIN 1120 - Black-oriented news
 WLZL - El Zol 107.9 - Bilingual Rhythmic CHR

Florida

Miami/Fort Lauderdale
 WMBM – 1490 - Urban contemporary gospel
 WMIB – 103.5 The Beat – Urban contemporary
WMIB HD-3 - PK's Throwback 105.5 - Classic Hip Hop
 WEDR – 99 Jamz – Urban contemporary
 WHQT – Hot 105 – Urban adult contemporary
 WXBN - Miami’s BIN 880 - Black-oriented news
 WEXY - AM 1520 - Urban contemporary gospel/Brokered programming
 WPOW - POWER 96 - Rhythmic Top 40
 WZTU - Tu 94.9 - Spanish Top 40
 WRMA - Ritmo 95.7 - Cubatón
 WRTO-FM - Mix 98.3 - Spanish tropical
 WXDJ - El Zol 106.7 - Spanish CHR

Tampa Bay Area
 WBTP – 95.7 The Beat – Urban contemporary
 WBTP HD-2 – Black Information Network - Black-oriented news
 WLLD – Wild 94.1 – Rhythmic contemporary hit radio
 WTMP - 1150 AM & 102.1 FM WTMP - Urban oldies
 WSUN - El Zol 97.1 - Spanish tropical
 WRUB - Rumba 106.5 - Spanish tropical
 WYUU - 92.5 Maxima FM - Latin pop
 WYUU-HD2 - Playa 106.9 - Spanish tropical

Jacksonville
 WZAZ – Gospel 1400 the Light – Urban contemporary gospel
 WJBT – 93.3 The Beat Jamz – Mainstream urban
WJBT HD-2 - Jacksonville's BIN 104.1 - Black-Oriented News
WJBT HD-3 - Classic Hip Hop
 WSOL-FM – V-101.5 – Urban Adult Contemporary
 WCGL – The Victory Station AM 1360 & 94.7 - Urban contemporary gospel
 WJGL-HD2 – Power 106.1 - Urban contemporary
 WJNJ – Pure Radio 1320 & 103.7 - Urban contemporary gospel
 WOKV-HD2 - Hot 99.5 - Urban Adult Contemporary
 WKSL HD-3 - Praise 107.9 - Urban contemporary gospel
 WYKB - Flow 105.3 - Spanish rhythmic
 WQIK-HD2 - Rumba 106.9 - Spanish tropical

Orlando/Daytona Beach
 WOKB – WOKB 1680 AM – Urban contemporary gospel
 WCFB – Star 94.5 – Urban adult contemporary
 WTKS-HD2  – 104.5 The Beat – Mainstream urban
 WPOZ-HD3 - "G-Praise 106.3/93.3" — Urban contemporary gospel 
 WPOZ-HD2 -  Hot 95.9 — Christian Hip Hop
 WHPB-LP - 98.5 The Wire - Urban Contemporary/Community Radio
 WHOG HD-2 - Hot 94.1 - Urban Contemporary (Daytona Beach)
 WRWS-LP - Urban contemporary
 WURB-LP - Urbana 92.7 - Spanish urban
 WFYY - Fly 103.1 - Rhythmic contemporary
 WRUM - Rumba 100.3 - Latin pop/Reggaeton/Tropical music
 WRUM-HD2 - Mega 97.1 - Spanish CHR
 WPYO - El Zol 95.3 - Spanish tropical
 WOEX - Exitos 96.5 - Spanish CHR

West Palm Beach
 WMBX – X102.3 – Urban Adult Contemporary
 WLLY HD-3 - Yo 107.1 - Classic Hip Hop
 WZZR HD-2 - Jam'n 93.3 - Classic Hip Hop
 WRLX - Mia 94.3 - Spanish CHR

Fort Myers/Naples
 WZKO - 1350/107.5 Jamz - Urban Adult Contemporary
 WBTT – 105.5 the Beat – Rhythmic contemporary hit radio
 WFFY - Fly 98.5 - Rhythmic Contemporary/Hip-Hop
 WOKE-LP - 94.9 The City - Urban Contemporary
 WXKB HD-2 - 96.5 & 101.5 The Bounce - Classic Hip Hop
 WHEL - 93.7 Latino - Spanish CHR
 WWCN - Playa 99.3 - Spanish tropical

Pensacola
 WRNE – Choice 106.9 & AM 980 – Urban adult contemporary
 WNVY – 1090AM the Light – Urban contemporary gospel
 WBLX-FM – 93BLX – Urban contemporary
 WRRX – Magic 106.1 – Urban adult contemporary
 WRGV - 107.3 The Beat - Mainstream urban

Tallahassee
 WSTT – AM 730 - Urban contemporary gospel
 WHBX – 96.1 Jamz – Urban adult contemporary
 WWLD – Blazin' 102.3 – Urban contemporary
 WANM - The Flava Station 90.5 - Urban Contemporary/College Radio
 WWLD HD-2 - Heaven 98.3 - Urban Gospel
 WGMY HD-2 - 105.3 The Beat - Mainstream urban
 WGMY HD-3 - Tallahassee's BIN 100.3 - Black-oriented news

Panama City
 WEBZ – 99.3 The Beat – Urban contemporary

Gainesville
 WTMN − Rejoice 1430 − Urban contemporary gospel
 WTMG – Magic 101.3 – Rhythmic contemporary
 WAJD - 98.9 Jamz - Urban contemporary
 WDVH - R&B 94.1 - Urban oldies-leaning urban adult contemporary
 WKTK-HD2/WRBD/WMOP - Power 92.1 - Urban contemporary

Vero Beach/Fort Pierce
 WFLM – 104.5 The Flame – Urban adult contemporary

Cocoa Beach
 WRRJ - Reggae

Lakeland/Winter Haven
 WSIR - Family Radio 1490 - Urban Gospel

Lake City
 WUAF-LP - Angel 107.9 - Gospel

Georgia

Atlanta
 WAOK – News/Talk 1380 WAOK - Urban News/Talk
 WPZE – Praise 102.5 – Urban contemporary gospel
 WAMJ and WUMJ – Majic 107.5/97.5 – Urban adult contemporary
 WALR-FM – Kiss 104.1 – Urban adult contemporary
 WHTA – Hot 107.9 – Urban contemporary
 WRDG - 105.3 The Beat - Mainstream Urban
 W233BF WIPK WFDR-FM WWSZ – Streetz 94.5 – Urban contemporary
 WVEE – V-103 (103.3) – Urban contemporary
 W275BK – Classix 102.9 – Urban Oldies
 W250BC – OG 97.9 – Classic hip-hop
 WSTR - Star 94 - Rhythmic Adult Contemporary
WAWR-db Atlwebradio.com -hip-hop, rap, r&b, black music
 WBIN - Atlanta’s BIN 640 - Black-oriented news
 WYKG - 105.5 FM/AM 1430 The King - Urban oldies, Classic hip-hop
 WBZY - Z105.7 - Spanish CHR

Augusta
 WEZO - 1230 The Blaze - Urban AC/Black Gospel
 WNRR - Gospel 1380 - Urban Gospel
 WTHB – Praise 1550 AM – Urban contemporary gospel
 WKZK – The Spirit 103.7 FM & 1600 AM – Urban contemporary gospel
 WAEG – Smooth Jazz 92.3 – Smooth jazz
 WAAW – Shout 94.7 – Urban contemporary gospel
 WKSP – 96.3 Kiss FM – Urban adult contemporary
 WTHB – Praise 96.9 – Urban contemporary gospel
 WIIZ – The Wiz 97.9 – Mainstream urban
 WAKB – Magic 100.9  – Urban adult contemporary
 WFXA – Foxie 103 Jamz – Mainstream urban
 WKZK – Sonshine 103.7 – Urban contemporary gospel
 WPRW – Power 107 – Mainstream urban
 WCHZ-FM – HOT 95.5/93.1 – Classic hip-hop
 WYBO - 92.9 The Soul Mine - Rhythmic Oldies
 WYNF - Augusta’s BIN 1340 - Black-oriented news

Savannah
 WSOK – 1230/103.5 WSOK – Urban contemporary gospel
 WEAS-FM − E-93 − Mainstream urban
 WQBT – 94.1 The Beat – Mainstream urban
 WLVH – Love 101.1 – Urban adult contemporary
 WTYB – Magic 103.9 – Urban adult contemporary
 WXYY - G100 - Rhythmic contemporary

Columbus
 WOKS – WOKS AM1340 – Rhythmic oldies
 WAGH – Magic 101.3 – Urban adult contemporary
 WBFA – 98.3 the Beat – Mainstream urban
 WEAM-FM – Praise 100.7 – Urban contemporary gospel
 WFXE – Foxie 105 – Urban contemporary
 WKZJ – K-92.7 – Urban adult contemporary
 WKCN HD2 – HIP HOP 106.5 – Classic hip-hop
 WTLM - Hallelujah 1520 AM - Urban contemporary gospel
 WHTY/W234BX - Columbus’ BIN 94.7/1460 - Black-oriented news
 WRCG - Flavor 92.1 - Urban gospel
 WRLD - 95.3 Smooth RnB - Urban adult contemporary

Macon
 WFXM – Power 107.1 – Mainstream urban
 WIBB-FM – 97.9 WIBB – Mainstream urban
 WLZN – MACON 92.3 – Urban contemporary
 WQMJ – Majic 100 – Urban oldies
 WRBV – V-101.7 – Urban adult contemporary
 WRWR – Kiss 105.1/107.5 – Urban adult contemporary
 WYPZ - Praise 99.5 - Urban gospel
 WMGE - Macon’s BIN 1670 - Black-oriented news

Albany
 WJYZ – AM960 the Light – Urban contemporary gospel
 WJIZ – 96.3 WJIZ – Mainstream urban
 WQVE – V-101.7 – Urban adult contemporary
 WMRZ – 98.1 Kiss FM - Urban adult contemporary
 WZBN – Praise 105.5 Urban contemporary gospel
 WMRG – "Streetz 93.5" - Urban contemporary
 WASU-LP - "Real 92.7" - Urban contemporary
 WTTY - "97.7 The Beat" - Urban Adult Contemporary

Brunswick
 WSOL-FM - V-101.5 – Urban Adult Contemporary
 WBGA - Hallelujah 96.3 – Urban Gospel

Valdosta
 WGUN – Magic 950 – Urban adult contemporary
 WHLJ-FM – Foxy 97.5 – Urban adult contemporary
 WGOV-FM – Power 96.7 – Mainstream urban
 WSTI-FM – Star 105.3 – Urban Adult Contemporary
 WWRQ-FM -  107.9 The Beat - Urban contemporary

Elberton
 WVGC - Jams 1400 - Urban adult contemporary

Dublin
 WDBN - 107.9 Jamz - Urban contemporary

Irwinton
 WVKX - Love 103.7 - Urban contemporary

LaGrange
 WBRQ - Q92 - Blues/Gospel

Lincolnton
 WLCZ - Gospel/Inspirational

Hawaii

Honolulu
 KUBT – 93.9 The Beat – Rhythmic contemporary
KUBT HD-2 - Jamz Hawaii - Classic Hip Hop
 KUMU-FM – 94.7 KUMU – Rhythmic adult contemporary
 KPHW - Power 104.3 - Rhythmic Top 40
 KQMQ-FM - HI93 - Contemporary Hawaiian/Reggae
 KDNN - Island 98.5 - Hawaiian contemporary hits
 KCCN-FM - FM100 - Hawaiian contemporary hits

Maui
 KJMD – Da Jam 98.3 – Rhythmic contemporary hit radio
 KLHI-FM - HI92 - Hawaiian/Reggae

Kauai
 KJMQ – 98.1 Jamz – Rhythmic contemporary hit radio
 KSRF - HI95 - Contemporary Hawaiian/Reggae

Idaho

Boise
 KWYD - Wild 101.1 – Rhythmic contemporary
 KFXD - Power 105.5 - Rhythmic contemporary
 KOAY - Project 88.7 - Rhythmic CHR

Illinois

Bloomington
 WXRJ-LP - Real Radio 94.9 - Urban Adult Contemporary

Chicago
 WGRB – Inspiration 1390 – Urban contemporary gospel
 WGCI-FM – 107.5 WGCI – Urban contemporary
 WVAZ – V103  – Urban adult contemporary
 WPWX – Power 92 – Urban contemporary
 WSRB – 106.3 – Urban adult contemporary
 WBMX - 104.3 Jams - Classic Hip Hop
 WVON - AM 1690 WVON - Urban Talk
 WYCA - Rejoice 102.3 - Urban Gospel
 WWHN - Comfortable Radio - Urban AC
 WOJO-HD2 - Streetz 95.1 & 105.1 HD2 - Urban contemporary
 WVIV-FM - Latino Mix 93.5 - Spanish rhythmic
 WBEZ-HD2 - WBEW Vocalo Urban Contemporary
 WMFN/WVAZ-HD2 - Chicago’s BIN 640 - Black-oriented news
 WJPC-LP - J99 Jams - Urban adult contemporary

Decatur
 WYDS-HD2 - Magic 95.5 - Urban Adult Contemporary

Champaign
 WCZQ – Hot 105.5 – Rhythmic Top 40

Peoria
 WAZU - Strictly Hip-Hop 90.7 FM - Urban Contemporary/Hip Hop
 WZPW – Z-92.3 – Rhythmic Top 40
 WPNV-LP - 106.3 WPNV - Urban Adult Contemporary
 WKZF - KZ-102.3 - Rhythmic Classic Hits
 WVEL - AM 1140 - Urban gospel

Rockford
 WYRB – Power 106 – Rhythmic Top 40

Quad Cities
 WGVV-LP – Groove 92.5 – Urban Contemporary

Indiana

Indianapolis
 WTLC – 1310 the Light – Urban contemporary gospel
 WHHH - Hot 100.9 - Urban contemporary
 WTLC-FM – WTLC 106.7 – Urban adult contemporary
 WZRL - Real 98.3 - Mainstream urban
 WSYW - Exitos 94.3 - Spanish CHR

South Bend
 WSMK – Smokin' 99.1 – Rhythmic Top 40
 WUBU – Mix 106 – Urban adult contemporary

Fort Wayne
WJFX-HD2 - Loud 103.3 - Rhythmic Top 40/Hip Hop
WJFX-HD3 – B-96.9 – Urban adult contemporary
WRNP/WBCL HD-2 - Rhythm & Praise 94.1 - Urban Gospel

Evansville
 WEOA – 98.5 WEOA – Urban Contemporary

Iowa

Des Moines
 KJMC – K-Jam 89.3 – Urban Adult Contemporary

Waterloo
 KBBG – 88.1 – Urban contemporary/Community radio
 KBDJ-LP - KBDJ 97.1 The Hot Jamz - Urban Contemporary

Kansas

Wichita
 KDGS – Power 93.5 – Rhythmic Top 40
KDGS-HD2 - The Love Train - Urban adult contemporary

Topeka
 KQRB - 96.9 The Beat - Urban Contemporary

Kentucky

Louisville
 WLLV – Gospel 101.9 FM & 1240 AM – Urban Gospel
 WLOU – 104.7 WLOU – Urban Oldies
 WGZB – B96.5 – Mainstream urban
 WMJM – Magic 101.3 – Urban adult contemporary
 WTFX-FM – Real 93.1 – Mainstream urban
 WRKA - 103.9 The Groove - Urban Adult Contemporary

Lexington
 WBTF – 107.9 the Beat – Urban contemporary
 WLKT HD-2 – Real 103.9 – Mainstream urban

Owensboro
 WXCM HD-3 - 100.5 The Vibe - Classic Hip Hop

Bowling Green
 WOVO-HD2/W239BT/W240CP - 95.9 The Vibe - Rhythmic Top 40

Louisiana

New Orleans
 WBOK - WBOK 1230 AM - Urban Talk, Urban Gospel, Brokered Programming
 KKNO – K-75AM & K-107.1 – Urban contemporary gospel
 WYLD – Hallelujah 940 – Urban contemporary gospel
 WODT/WNOE-HD2/K244FX - New Orleans’ BIN 1280 - Black-oriented news
 WQUE-FM – Q93FM – Mainstream urban
 WYLD-FM – WYLD FM98 – Urban adult contemporary
 KMEZ – KMEZ 102.9 – Urban adult contemporary
 WRNO-HD2/K242CE - Throwback 96.3 - Classic hip hop
 KKND - Heaven 106.7 - Urban Gospel
 WFNO - Latino Mix 97.5 - Spanish Hot AC

Baton Rouge
 WPFC – 1550 WPFC - Urban Gospel
 WXOK – Heaven 1460 – Urban contemporary gospel
 KQXL-FM – Q-106.5 – Urban adult contemporary
 KHXT – Hot 107.9 – Rhythmic contemporary (Lafayette)
 WEMX – Max 94.1 – Hip-Hop/Rhythmic contemporary
 WTQT-LP - 106.1 -   Urban gospel
 KCLF - 1500 - Rhythmic oldies

Shreveport/Bossier City
 KMJJ-FM – 99.7 KMJJ – Urban contemporary
 KBTT – 103-7 tha Beat – Mainstream urban
 KDKS – Hot 102 – Urban adult contemporary
 KVMA-FM – Magic 102.9 – Urban adult contemporary
 KOKA – AM 980 KOKA – Urban contemporary gospel
 KIOU – 1480 – Urban contemporary gospel
 KSYB – 1300 – Urban contemporary gospel

Lafayette
 KFXZ-FM – Z105.9 – Urban adult contemporary
 KNEK/KNEK-FM –  Magic 104.7 – Urban adult contemporary
 KHXT – Hot 107.9 – Rhythmic contemporary hit radio
 KRRQ –  Q95.5 – Urban contemporary
 KZJM-LP - 92.7 Jam Central - Urban Contemporary

Alexandria
 KTTP – KTTP AM 1110 – Urban contemporary gospel
 KKST – Kiss 98.7 – Urban contemporary
 KKST-HD2 - Urban adult contemporary
 KKST-HD3 - Urban contemporary gospel
 KMXH – Mix 93.9 – Urban adult contemporary, Blues

Lake Charles
 KTSR - Magic 92.1 - Urban Adult Contemporary
 KJMH – 107 Jamz – Mainstream urban
 KZWA – Live 104.9 – Urban Adult Contemporary
 KPPM-LP - King Power Praise Music 105.3 - Urban Gospel

Monroe/Bastrop
 KRVV – 100.1 the Beat – Urban contemporary
 KMVX – Mix 101.9 – Urban adult contemporary
 KJMG – Majic 97 – Urban adult contemporary
 KOUS-LP - 96.3 - Urban Oldies

Morgan City
 KBZE - 105.9 The Breeze - Urban Adult Contemporary

Maine

Augusta
 WHTP – Hot Radio Maine – Top 40 (Rhythmic)

Bangor
 WHZP – Hot Radio Maine – Top 40 (Rhythmic)

Portland
 WHTP-FM – Hot 104.7 – Top 40 (Rhythmic)

Maryland

Baltimore
 WCAO – Heaven 600AM – Urban contemporary gospel
 WOLB – 1010 Urban News/Talk
 WWIN – Spirit 1400AM – Urban contemporary gospel
 WERQ – 92Q Jams – Mainstream urban
 WWIN-FM – Magic 95.9 – Urban adult contemporary
 WQLL/W260BV - Baltimore’s BIN 1370 - Black-oriented news
 WLIF HD-2 - Praise 106.1 - Urban Gospel

Salisbury
 WSBY – Magic 98.9 – Urban adult contemporary
 WESM – FM 91.3 – Jazz
 WZEB – Power 101.7 - Rhythmic Top 40
 WKTT - Live 97.5 - Urban Contemporary

Hagerstown
 WDLD - Live 96.7 - Rhythmic Top 40

Massachusetts

Boston/Lawrence
 WJMN-FM – Jam'n 94.5 – Rhythmic contemporary
 WJMN-HD2 - Black Information Network - Black-oriented news
 WBQT- Hot 96.9 – Rhythmic Hot AC
 WUBG/WCCM - LatinX 105.3/103.7 - Spanish CHR
 WAMG - "La Mega 94.9" - Spanish tropical
 WLLH - "La Mega 95.1" - Spanish tropical
 WERS-HD2 - WERS Plus 88.9 HD-2 Boston's Black Experience - Urban contemporary
 WZRM - Rumba 97.7 - Spanish tropical
 WJDA - "Latina 99.9 FM" - Reggaeton
 WNNW - "Power 800 AM/102.9 FM" - Spanish tropical

Springfield
 WHYN-HD2 - 97.3 The Beat - Urban contemporary
 WSPR - Bomba FM - Spanish tropical

Michigan

Detroit
 WMXD – Mix 92.3 – Urban adult contemporary
 WJLB – 97.9 WJLB – Urban contemporary
 WDZH-HD2 – Smooth jazz v-98.7 – Jazz
 WDMK – 105.9 Kiss FM – Urban adult contemporary
 WDMK HD-2 - The Detroit Praise Network 98.3 & 99.9 - Urban Gospel
 WGPR – Hot 107-5 – Urban contemporary
 WMGC-FM - 105.1 The Bounce - Classic Hip-Hop & R&B
 WCHB – 1340 WCHB - Urban contemporary gospel
 WMKM - Rejoice AM 1440 - Urban Gospel
 WDFN - Detroit’s BIN 1130 - Black-oriented news
 WSHJ - 88.3 FM - Urban contemporary

Grand Rapids
 WDPW –  Power 91.9 – Urban contemporary gospel
 WJWC-LP -  97.3 The Heat - Urban Contemporary/ Community radio
 WSNX –  104.5 WSNX – Rhythmic Top 40
 WNWZ – Magic 104.9 – Urban Contemporary
 WPRR - 102.5 The Ride - Urban Adult Contemporary

Kalamazoo/Battle Creek
 WFPM-LP - Miracle Radio 99.5 FM - Urban gospel
 WBXX/WKFR-HD2 - 102.5/104.9 The Block - Urban adult contemporary
 WTOU – The Touch 95.5 FM & 1660 AM – Urban adult contemporary

Lansing
 WWSJ – Joy 1580 & 100.3 – Urban contemporary gospel
 WQHH – Power 96.5 FM – Urban contemporary
 WQTX - Stacks 92.1 - Rhythmic Adult Contemporary

Muskegon
 WVIB – V-100 – Urban adult contemporary
 WUVS-LP – 103.7 The Beat – Urban contemporary/Community radio
 WUGM-LP – 106.1 – Motown / Electronic dance music

Flint
 WFLT - AM 1420 - Urban Gospel
 WDZZ-FM – Z92.7 – Urban adult contemporary
 WRCL – Club 93.7 – Rhythmic contemporary hit radio
 WOWE - 98.9 The Beat - Urban Contemporary

Saginaw/Bay City
 WTLZ – Kiss 107.1 – Urban adult contemporary

Greenville
 WDPW - Power 91.9 - Urban contemporary gospel

Minnesota

Minneapolis/Saint Paul
 KMOJ – 89.9 KMOJ  – Urban contemporary/Community radio
 KMOJ-HD2 - The Ice 89.9 HD-2 - Hip Hop
 KTCZ-HD3 - Hot 102.5 - Mainstream urban
 KQQL-HD2/W227BF - Twin Cities’ BIN 93.3 - Black-oriented news

Mississippi

Jackson
 WOAD – Gospel 1300 AM & 103.5 FM - Urban contemporary gospel 
 WJSU-FM – FM 88 – Jazz
 WMPR – WMPR 90.1 FM - Urban contemporary, Blues, Urban Gospel, Variety
 WHLH – 95.5 Hallelujah FM – Urban contemporary gospel
 WRBJ-FM – 97.7 FM – Urban contemporary
 WJMI – 99 Jams – Mainstream urban
 WKXI-FM – Kixie 107 – Urban adult contemporary
 WRTM-FM – Smooth 100.5 – Urban adult contemporary
 WFQY – BDAY 99.1 – Old-school hip hop
 WJDX-FM - Real 105.1 - Mainstream urban
 WSFZ/W251DB - Jackson’s BIN 98.1 - Black-oriented news
 WONG - Soul 1150 - Urban AC/Gospel music
 WMGO - AM 1370 Urban contemporary
 WHJT HD-2 - Blues 93.1 - Blues
 WIIN - 102.1 The Box - Rhythmic Oldies

Gulfport/Biloxi
 WQFX – My Power Gospel 98.7 FM & 1130 AM – Urban contemporary gospel
 WJZD-FM – JZ94.5 – Urban contemporary
 WGBL - G-96.7 - Classic Hip Hop

Hattiesburg/Laurel
 WHJA – Power 101.1 – Classic Hip Hop, Urban Oldies, Blues
 WORV – WORV 1580 AM – Urban contemporary gospel
 WJKX – 102JKX – Urban adult contemporary
 WJMG – 92.1 WJMG – Urban contemporary
 WZLD – Wild 106.3 – Mainstream urban
 WGDQ - 93.1 WGDQ - Urban Gospel
 WQID-LP - Hot 105.3 - Urban contemporary
 WXRR HD-2 - 97.7 The Groove - Rhythmic Oldies

Greenville/Greenwood
 WIBT – 97.9 The Beat – Urban contemporary
 WBAD – Bad 94 – Urban adult contemporary/Blues
 WGNG – 106.3 The Heat – Urban contemporary
 WGNL – 104.3 WGNL – Urban oldies
 KZYQ - Star 101 - Urban adult contemporary
 WNLA - Gospel
 WGRM-FM - Blazin’ 93.9 - Urban oldies

Clarksdale/Cleveland
 WAID – "Power 106.5" – Urban contemporary
 WCLD-FM – "Jammin' 104" – Urban contemporary
 WZYQ - "Star 101" - Urban adult contemporary

Meridian
 WJXM - 95.1 The Beat - Mainstream Urban
 WMER – Solid Gospel 1390 – Urban contemporary gospel
 WZKS – Kiss 104.1 – Urban adult contemporary
 WMOG - Praise 95.9 FM & 910 AM - Urban Gospel
 WHSL - Hot 107.7 - Urban adult contemporary

Tupelo
 WESE – 92.5 THE BEAT – Urban contemporary
 WSEL-FM – Inspiration 97 – Urban contemporary gospel
 WELO/W282AS - Pulse 104.3 & 580 - Classic soul
 WTUP/W299CS- Tupelo’s BIN 107.7 - Black-oriented news

Columbus
 WACR-FM – WACR 105.3 – Urban adult contemporary
 WAJV – Joy 98.9 – Urban contemporary gospel
 WMSU – Power 92 FM – Mainstream urban
 WMXU – Mix 106.1 – Urban adult contemporary
 WTWG - AM 1050 - Gospel

Liberty
 WAZA - The Touch 107.7 - Urban contemporary

Holly Springs
 WKRA-FM - The Change 92.7 - Urban Gospel/Urban Contemporary

Natchez
 WNAT - Jam’n 106.3 - Rhythmic AC
 WTYJ - 97.7 The Beat - Urban contemporary

Missouri

Saint Louis
 KATZ – Hallelujah 1600 AM – Urban contemporary gospel
 KSTL – Jubilee 690 – Urban contemporary gospel
 KATZ-FM – 100.3 The Beat – Mainstream urban
 KATZ-HD2/W279AQ – St Louis’ BIN 103.7 - Black-oriented news
 WFUN-FM – 96.3 The Lou – Urban adult contemporary
 WHHL – Hot 104.1 – Urban contemporary
 KTLK-FM HD-2 - Majic 104.9 HD-2 - Urban Adult Contemporary
 KSIQ-LP - Mix 99.5 - Urban Adult Contemporary

Kansas City
 KPRT – Gospel 1590 AM & 106.1 FM KPRT – Urban Gospel
 KCKC-HD2 – Star 102 – Jammin' Oldies
 KMJK – 107.3 – Urban Contemporary
 KMJK-HD2 – Old-school hip hop
 KPRS – Hot 103 Jamz – Urban contemporary
 KPRS-HD2 - K-103.3 HD-2 - Urban Oldies 
 KCPZ-LP - Praise 95.3 - Urban Gospel

Columbia/Jefferson City
 KJLU – 88.9 – Jazz/Urban contemporary

Jackson/Cape Girardeau
 KJXX - 101.9 The Block - Rhythmic Adult Contemporary

Nebraska

Omaha
 KOPW – Power 106-9 – Rhythmic Top 40
 KOWN-LP - 95.7 The Boss - Urban Contemporary/Hip Hop
 KXNB-LP - Mind And Soul 101.3 - Urban Contemporary
 KJSO-LP - 101.3 FM - Hip Hop (Shares time with KXNB-LP)
 KCUG-LP - 100.3 FM - Urban Gospel

Nevada

Las Vegas
 KCEP – Power 88FM – Urban contemporary/Community radio
 KOAS – Jammin' 105.7 – Urban Adult Contemporary
 KVEG – Hot 97.5 – Rhythmic contemporary hit radio/Hip hop
 KYMT-HD2 - Real 103.9 - Urban Contemporary
 KXQQ-FM - Q100.5 - Rhythmic Adult Contemporary
 KXQQ-HD3 - 100.5 Jamz - Hip hop
 KRGT - Latino Mix 99.3 - Spanish Urban
 KRRN - Fuego 92.7 - Bilingual Rhythmic Contemporary

Reno
 KNEV - 95.5 The Vibe - Classic Hip Hop
 KLCA HD-2/K285EQ/K228DA - Swag 104.9 & 93.5 - Urban Contemporary/Hip Hop
 KWYL - Wild 102.9 - Rhythmic Top 40

New Hampshire

Concord
WJYY - 105.5 JYY - Rhythmic Top 40

Hanover
WTSL - Hot 97.5 - Classic Hip Hop

New Jersey

Atlantic City
 WEHA – 88.7 - Urban Gospel
 WTTH – 96.1 WTTH – Urban adult contemporary
 WZBZ – 99.3 The Buzz – Rhythmic Top 40

Beach Haven West
 WVBH - Reach Gospel Radio 88.3 FM - Urban gospel

Trenton
 WIFI - Jamz 92.9 - Urban contemporary

New Mexico

Albuquerque/Santa Fe
 KKSS – Kiss 97.3 – Rhythmic contemporary hit radio
 KMGG-LP - 99.9 The Beat - Urban adult contemporary
KMGG-LP HD-2 Wild 99.9 HD-2 - Hip Hop
 KABQ-FM - Hot 95.1 - Rhythmic Oldies / Classic hip hop
 KZRR HD-2/K265CA - Power 100.9 - Mainstream urban
 KYLZ - 101.3 The Hustle - Rhythmic Hot AC
 KJFA/KJFA-FM - Fuego 102.9 - Hispanic rhythmic

Las Cruces
 KHQT - Hot 103 - Rhythmic Top 40
 KSIL - Latin X 94.3 - Bilingual Rhythmic CHR

Farmington
 KXTC - 99.9 XTC - Rhythmic Top 40

New York

New York City
 WLIB – 1190 WLIB – Urban contemporary gospel
 WBLS – 107.5 WBLS – Urban adult contemporary
 WKTU – KTU 103.5 – Rhythmic adult contemporary
 WQHT – Hot 97 – Mainstream urban
 WWPR-FM – Power 105.1 – Mainstream urban
 WWRL/WWPR-HD3 - New York’s BIN 1600 - Black-oriented news
 WXNY-FM - La X 96.3 - Hispanic rhythmic
 WXBK - 94.7 The Block - Classic hip hop
 WSKQ-FM - Mega 97.9 - Spanish tropical
 WPAT-FM - 93.1 Amor - Spanish tropical

Buffalo
 WUFO – Power 96.5 – Urban adult contemporary
 WWWS – Classic R&B 107.3 FM & AM 1400 – Urban oldies
 WBLK – Power 93.7 WBLK – Urban contemporary
 WBLK-HD2 – Urban adult contemporary
 WBBF - 98.9 The Vibe - Classic Hip Hop

Rochester
 WDKX – 103.9 WDKX – Urban contemporary
 WKGS – 106.7 KISS FM - Rhythmic Top 40
 WLGZ-HD2 - 105.5 The Beat - Urban Contemporary
 WXIR-LP - 100.9 Extreme Independent Radio - Urban Variety
 WRSB - Mega 97.5 - Spanish CHR

Syracuse
 WSIV – Inspirtational 1540 AM & 106.3 FM – Urban contemporary gospel
 WHEN/W269DT/WSYR-FM HD 2  – Power 620 – Urban adult contemporary 
 WJPZ – Z-89 – Rhythmic Top 40
 WMVN – 96.5/100.3 The Beat – Rhythmic Top 40

Albany
 WAJZ – Jamz 96.3 – Rhythmic contemporary hit radio
 WQBK-HD2 – Hot 99.1 – Urban contemporary

Binghamton
 WJOB-FM - 93.3 WJOB - Urban Contemporary

Utica
 WUSP/WRCK - 95.5 The Heat - Urban contemporary

North Carolina

Asheville
  WBMU – Progressive Radio - Urban contemporary Jazz Urban contemporary gospel (Online Only at wbmu.net)
 WRES-LP - WRES 100.7 - Urban Contemporary/Urban Variety

Charlotte
 WDEX – 1430 AM – Urban contemporary gospel
 WPZS – Praise 100.9 – Urban contemporary gospel
 WOSF – 105.3 RNB – Urban adult contemporary
 WBAV – V101.9 – Urban adult contemporary
 WFNZ  – 102.5 The Block – Urban contemporary
 WGIV/WDYT – 1370 AM / 1220 AM / W277CB / W263CY / W281BY Streetz 103.3 & 100.5 – Urban contemporary
 WPEG – Power 98 (97.9) – Mainstream urban
 WPEG-HD2 – Old school Hip hop
 WRFX-HD2/W254AZ - Charlotte’s BIN 98.7 - Black-oriented news
 WOGR-FM - Wordnet 93.3 - Gospel

Greensboro/Winston-Salem/High Point
 WJMH – 102 Jamz – Urban contemporary
 WQMG - 97.1QMG - Urban adult contemporary
 WEAL – 1510AM Big WEAL Gospel – Urban contemporary gospel
 WKEW/WPOL – The Light 1340 & 1400 – Urban contemporary gospel

Raleigh/Durham
 WAUG – Hot 97.9 FM/750 AM – Mainstream urban
 WDCG-HD2 - 95.1/95.3 The Beat - Classic hip hop
 WQOK – K 97.5 – Urban contemporary
 WFXC/WFXK – Foxy 107/104 – Urban adult contemporary
 WNNL - The Light 103.9 - Urban contemporary gospel

Fayetteville/Lumberton/Fairmont
 WCCG – 104.5 – Mainstream urban
 WZFX – Foxy 99.1 – Urban contemporary
 WMGU – Magic 106.9 – Urban adult contemporary
 WUKS – 107.7 Jamz – Urban adult contemporary
 WIDU - 99.7 FM/1600 AM - Urban contemporary gospel
 WAGR - 97.1 FM/98.5FM/1340 AM - Urban contemporary gospel
 WFMO - The Light 97.5 FM/860 AM - Urban contemporary gospel

Wilmington
 WMNX – Coast 97.3 – Urban contemporary
 WKXB – Jammin 99.9 – Rhythmic oldies

New Bern/Greenville/Jacksonville/Moorehead City
 WIKS – 101.9 Kiss FM – Urban contemporary
 WWMC – 1010 AM – Urban contemporary gospel
 WFMC – 730 AM – Urban contemporary gospel
 WNCT – Beach Boogie & Blues 1070 AM / 105.9 / 95.7 / 101.1  – Rhythmic oldies
 WNBU - Groovin’ Oldies 94.1 & 97.9 - Rhythmic oldies

Rocky Mount/Wilson
 WRSV - Choice FM 92.1 - Mainstream urban
 WPWZ - Power 95.5 - Urban contemporary
 WYLT-LP - Smooth Radio 100.3 - Urban oldies, Southern soul
 WAJA-LP - 102.5 The Promise - Urban contemporary gospel
 WCPS - Power 96.3 FM/760 AM – Urban contemporary gospel, Urban oldies, Southern soul                                                                                                                                                     
 WRMT - Step 98.1 FM/1490 AM - Urban contemporary gospel
 WEED - Jammin Gospel 1390 AM – Urban contemporary gospel
 WUBN-LP - 106.9 The Spirit – Urban contemporary gospel
 WZAX - Movin’ 99 FM - Rhythmic Hot AC

Warrenton
 WARR 103.5 FM/1520 AM – Urban contemporary gospel, Urban oldies, Southern soul

Elizabeth City/Nags Head
 WFMZ 104.9 The Block – Urban contemporary
 WBXB 100.1 The B – Urban Adult Contemporary
 WFMI Rejoice 100.9 - Urban contemporary gospel
 WRVS-FM - 89.9 - Urban contemporary

Goldsboro/Kinston
 WFMC Gospel 105.7 FM/730 AM - Urban contemporary gospel
 WWMC Gospel 92.9 FM/1010 AM - Urban contemporary gospel
 WSSG 92.7 Jamz FM/1300 AM - Mainstream urban
 WELS-FM Beach Boogie & Blues 102.9 - Rhythmic oldies

Smithfield
 WMPM The big 1270 AM/94.3 FM - Urban contemporary gospel, Urban oldies, Southern soul

Roanoke Rapids
 WYTT 99.5 & 105.9 Jamz - Urban adult contemporary                                           
 WCBT Soul 102.7/1230AM - Urban contemporary gospel, Urban oldies, Southern soul

North Dakota

Fargo
 KLTA-HD2/K245BY - 96.9 Hits FM - Rhythmic Top 40

Ohio

Cleveland
 WENZ – Z-107.9 – Mainstream Urban
 WZAK – 93.1 WZAK – Urban adult contemporary
 WAKS-HD2 - Real 106.1 - Urban contemporary
 WJMO – Praise 94.5 – Urban contemporary gospel
 WMMS-HD2/W256BT - Cleveland’s BIN 99.1 - Black-oriented news
 WABQ - Urban gospel
 WCCD - Radio 1000 - Gospel/Religious

Cincinnati

 WIZF – 101.1 The Wiz – Urban contemporary
 WOSL – 100.3 R&B – Urban oldies-leaning urban adult contemporary
 WEBN-HD3 – 102.3 The Beat – Mainstream urban
 WGRI – Inspiration 1050 & 103.1 – Urban contemporary gospel
 WDBZ – The Buzz 1230 AM – Urban Talk/Urban Contemporary
 WCVG - 1320 The Voice - Urban Gospel/Brokered Programming

Columbus
 WZCB – 106.7 The Beat – Mainstream Urban
 WZCB HD-2 - Throwback 105.3 - Classic Hip Hop
 WCKX / WHTD – Power 107.5/106.3 – Urban Contemporary
 WXMG – Magic 95.5 – Urban Adult Contemporary
 WYTS - Columbus’ BIN 1230 - Black-oriented news
 WJYD – Joy 107.1 - Black Gospel

Dayton
 WDHT – Hot 102.9 – Rhythmic contemporary/Hip Hop
 WROU-FM – 92.1 WROU – Urban adult contemporary
 WDAO – WDAO 1210AM – Urban adult contemporary
 WHKO-HD3 – The Soul of Dayton 98.7 – Urban oldies
 WIZE - Dayton’s BIN 1340 - Black-oriented news

Toledo
 WJZE – Hot 97-3 – Mainstream urban
 WJUC – 107.3 the Juice – Classic Hip Hop/Urban Adult Contemporary
 WIMX – Mix 95.7 – Urban adult contemporary
 WVKS-HD2  – 94.9 The Beat – Mainstream urban
 WTOD-HD2 - Party 103.3 - Rhythmic Top 40

Youngstown
 WGFT – Star 94.7 – Urban adult contemporary
 WLOA - Loud 102.3 - Rhythmic contemporary/Hip Hop
 WAKZ - Real 95.9 - Mainstream urban
 WKTX - 99.7 The Drum - Urban oldies/Urban contemporary gospel

Middleton
 WMPO - 94Q FM - Rhythmic Top 40

Oklahoma

Oklahoma City
 KRMP – Heart & Soul 92.1 & 1140 – Urban adult contemporary
 KTLV – AM 1220 – Urban contemporary gospel
 KVSP – Power 103.5 – Mainstream urban
 KOMA-HD3 - V-103 - Old School Hip-Hop
 KINB HD-3 - Praise 105.3 HD-3 - Urban Gospel

Tulsa
 KGTO – Heart & Soul 99.1 & 1050 – Urban adult contemporary
 KJMM – 105.3 - 105 K-Jamz – Urban contemporary

Lawton
 KJMZ – 97.9 Jamz – Urban contemporary
 KXCA – Heart & Soul 93.7 & 1050 – Urban adult contemporary

Langston
 KALU – 89.3 – Urban Contemporary/College Radio

Oregon

Portland
 KBMS – Best Music Station AM 1480 – Urban adult contemporary
 KXJM – JAMMIN' 107.5 – Rhythmic contemporary
 KINK HD-2/K275CH - WE 102.9 - Rhythmic Top 40/Hip Hop
 KOOR - 1010 Urbana - Spanish rhythmic

Klamath Falls
 KKKJ - 3KJ Jammin 105.5 - Rhythmic CHR

Pennsylvania

Easton/Allentown/Bethlehem
 WEST/WHOL - Loud 106.9/99.5 - Rhythmic Contemporary/Hip Hop
 WTKZ - Mega 101.7 - Spanish CHR

Erie
 WXKC HD-2 - 104.3 The Vibe - Classic Hip Hop

Harrisburg
 WHKF - Real 99.3 - Urban Contemporary

Philadelphia
 WURD – AM 900 – Urban talk
 WPPZ – Classix 107.9 – Urban oldies
 WPPZ-HD2 - Praise 107.9 HD2 - Urban contemporary gospel
 WDAS-FM – 105.3 WDAS – Urban adult contemporary
 WRNB – 100.3 RNB – Urban adult contemporary
 WRNB HD-2 - 100.3 HD2 R&B & Hip-Hop - Urban contemporary
 WUSL – Power 99FM (98.9) – Mainstream urban
 WJBR-FM HD-3 - Philly's Favor 100.7 - Urban contemporary gospel
 WTEL/WDAS-HD2 - Philadelphia’s BIN 610 - Black-oriented news
 WUMR - Rumba 106.1 - Spanish CHR
 WEMG - Mega 105.7 - Spanish CHR
 WHAT - La Kalle 99.9 - Spanish tropical
 WPEN-HD3 - RITMO FM - Spanish tropical

Pittsburgh
 WGBN – Power 1360  98.9 FM – Urban Gospel
 WAMO - WAMO 107.3 - Urban Contemporary/Hip Hop

Reading
 WIOV - Loud 98.5 - Rhythmic Contemporary/Hip Hop
 WLAN - Rumba 100.5 - Spanish tropical

State College
 WRSC HD-3 - Loud 101.5 - Rhythmic Contemporary/Hip Hop

York
 WGLD - Mega 107.1 - Spanish CHR

Rhode Island

Providence
 WWKX – Hot 106 – Rhythmic contemporary hit radio
 WSTL - Mega 94.9 - Spanish tropical

South Carolina

Greenville/Spartanburg/Anderson
 WGTK-HD3 - Rejoice 96.9 - Urban contemporary gospel
 WFBC-HD2 96.3/104.5/107.7 The Block - Mainstream Urban
 WJMZ – 107.3 Jamz – Urban adult contemporary
 WHZT - Hot 98.1 - Rhythmic Top 40
 WLAS - Power 95 - Urban contemporary
 WXRU-LP - Smooth 107.9 - Rhythmic oldies, Urban oldies
 WGVL - Greenville’s BIN 1440 - Black-oriented news
 WASC - 1530 Solid Gold Soul - Urban oldies

Charleston
 WJNI – Gospel 106.3 – Urban contemporary gospel
 WSPO - Heaven 100.1 - Urban contemporary gospel
 WWWZ - Z-93 Jamz - Mainstream urban
 WJNI-HD2 - Old school 92.1 - Classic hip hop
 WMGL – Magic 107.3 – Urban adult contemporary
 WXST – Star 99.7 – Urban adult contemporary
 WXST-HD2 - 99.3 The Box - Mainstream urban

Columbia
 WFMV – Gospel 620 AM 96.1/98.9/107.1 – Urban contemporary gospel
 WDEK - Praise 95.7 & 1170 - Urban contemporary gospel
 WJTB-HD2 - 105.1Worship and Word Network - Urban contemporary gospel
 WXBT – 100.1 The Beat – Urban contemporary
 WXBT HD-2 - Columbia’s BIN 105.5 - Black-oriented news
 WHXT/WSCZ – Hot 103.9/93.9 – Mainstream urban
 WLXC – Kiss 103.1 – Urban adult contemporary
 WWDM – 101.3 The Big DM – Urban adult contemporary

Myrtle Beach
 WMIR – Rejoice 1200 AM/103.5 – Urban contemporary gospel
 WPJS – Gospel 1330 AM – Urban contemporary gospel
 WDAI – 98.5 Kiss FM – Mainstream urban

Florence
 WBZF / WYNN – Glory 98.5 FM/540 AM – Urban contemporary gospel
 WJAY - 98.3 FM/1280 AM - Urban contemporary gospel
 WALD - 98.7 FM/1080 AM - Urban contemporary gospel
 WPDT – Almighty 105.1 – Urban contemporary gospel
 WCMG – Magic 94.3 – Urban adult contemporary
 WZTF – The Flo 102.9 – Urban adult contemporary
 WYNN – WYNN 106.3 – Mainstream urban
 WDAR-FM – 105.5 The Beat – Mainstream urban
 WSIM-HD2 - Jamz 107.5 - Classic hip hop

Sumter
 WXHL - Reach Gospel Radio 89.1 - Urban contemporary gospel
 WLJI – Almighty 98.3 – Urban contemporary gospel
 WWHM – OldSchool 93.3/92.3 – Urban oldies

Orangeburg
 WOCS – 93.7 – Urban adult contemporary
 WQKI-FM – Jamz 95.7 – Classic hip hop
 WSPX – Almighty 94.5 – Urban contemporary gospel

Camden
 WEAF - 1130 AM/99.5 - Urban contemporary gospel

St. Stephen
 WTUA – Power 106 – Urban contemporary gospel

Beaufort
 WVGB - Praise 94.5/1490 AM -Urban contemporary gospel
 WKWQ - 100.7 -Urban adult contemporary

Greenwood
 WCZZ - Magic 102.7/1090 AM - Urban oldies

Denmark
 WVCD - 96.5 FM/790 AM - Urban adult contemporary, Urban contemporary gospel

South Dakota
 SFR SiouxFallsRadio.com – Hip hop

Tennessee

Memphis
 WBBP – AM 1480 - Urban Gospel
 WDIA – WDIA AM1070 – Urban oldies
 WLOK – 1340 WLOK – Urban contemporary gospel
 WLRM – Love WLRM 1380AM – Urban adult contemporary/Urban contemporary gospel
 KJMS – V-101.1 – Urban adult contemporary
 KJMS-HD2 - Black Information Network - Black-oriented news
 KXHT – Hot 107.1 – Mainstream urban
 WHAL-FM – Hallelujah 95.7 – Urban contemporary gospel
 WHRK – K-97.1 – Mainstream urban
 WRBO – 103.5 WRBO – Urban Adult Contemporary
 WQOX - 88.5 The Voice Of SCS - Urban Adult Contemporary
 WHBQ-HD2 - Bumpin 96.3 - Classic hip hop

Nashville
 WENO – 760 AM The Gospel - Urban Gospel
 WVOL – WVOL 1470 AM – Urban Oldies/Talk
 WQQK – 92Q – Urban adult contemporary
 WQQK-HD2 – Rhythmic Top 40
 WUBT – 101.1 The Beat – Urban contemporary
 WDRM-DB - 96.1 JAMZ (Internet Radio) - Rhythmic Top 40
 WPRT-HD2 - 102.1 The Ville - Urban adult contemporary
 WNRQ-HD2/W248BQ - Nashville’s BIN 97.5 - Black-oriented news

Knoxville
 WJBE – Jammin' 99.7 FM & 1040 AM – Urban Adult Contemporary
 WKHT – Hot 104.5 – Rhythmic Top 40/ Mainstream Urban
 WTLT - Lit 97.1 - Urban contemporary
WWKB - 92.5 The Block (Internet Radio) Rhythmic Top 40

Chattanooga
 WNOO – 107.3 FM & 1260 AM – Urban Adult contemporary/Urban Gospel
 WJTT – Power 94 – Mainstream urban
 WMPZ – G-93 – Urban adult contemporary
 WUSY HD-2 - Real 100.7 HD2 - Mainstream Urban
WPTP-LP 100.1 - Urban Gospel

Jackson
 WFKX – 96 KIX – Urban contemporary
 WYJJ – JJ 97.7 – Urban adult contemporary
 WJAK - Hot 96.1 - 96.1/1460 - Urban contemporary

Johnson City
 WWTB – 105.3 The Beat – 105.3 FM/980 AM - Rhythmic Contemporary

Texas

Dallas/Fort Worth
 KGGR – KGGR 1040AM – Urban contemporary gospel
 KHVN/KKGM/K237HD – Dallas’ BIN – Black-oriented news
 KBFB – 97.9 the Beat – Urban contemporary
 KKDA – K-104 (104.5) – Urban contemporary
 KRNB – Smooth R&B 105.7 – Urban adult contemporary
 KZMJ – Majic 94.5 – Urban adult contemporary
 KDXX/KESS-FM - Latino Mix 107.9/107.1 - Spanish CHR

Houston
 KCOH – 1230 The Source – Urban Oldies/Talk
 KYOK – KYOK AM 1140 & FM 92.3 – Urban contemporary gospel
 KWWJ – Gospel 96.9 FM & 1360 AM KWWJ – Urban contemporary gospel
 KBXX – 97.9 the Box – Rhythmic Contemporary
 KMJQ – Majic 102.1 – Urban adult contemporary
 KQBT – 93.7 The Beat – Urban contemporary
 KMAZ-LP - Amazing 102.5 - Urban Adult Contemporary/Urban Gospel
 KXYZ - Houston’s BIN 1320 - Black-oriented news
 KAMA-FM - Latino Mix 104.9 - Spanish rhythmic
 KROI/KMJQ HD-2 - Praise 92.1 & 102.1 HD-2 - Urban Gospel

San Antonio
 KCHL – Gospel 92.1 FM & 1480 AM – Urban contemporary gospel
 KRTU-HD2/KROV-FM – 91.7 HD-2 KROV-FM – Urban contemporary/Community radio
 KBBT – 98.5 The Beat – Rhythmic contemporary
 KTFM-HD2/K233DB - We 94.5 - Rhythmic Contemporary/Hip Hop
 KVBH - Vibe 107.5 - Rhythmic Adult Contemporary
 KZEP-FM - 104.5 Latino Hits - Spanish CHR

Austin
 KAZI-FM – KAZI 88.7 – Urban contemporary/Community radio
 KKMJ HD-3 – Hot 95.9  – Classic Hip Hop
 KPEZ-FM – 102.3 The Beat – Rhythmic contemporary hit radio/Hip Hop

Beaumont/Port Arthur
 KZZB – KZZB, Rejoice 990 – Urban contemporary gospel
 KTCX – Magic 102.5 – Urban contemporary
 KKMY – 104.5 KISS-FM – Rhythmic Top 40
KKMY HD-2/K277AG – 103.3 The Beat – Mainstream urban

Amarillo
 KQIZ-FM – 93.1 The Beat – Rhythmic Top 40

Abilene
 KKHR - My 106.3 - Spanish CHR
 KTJK-HD2 - Infinity FM - Rhythmic Top 40

Lubbock
 KBTE – 104.9 The Beat – Urban Contemporary
 KLZK-HD2/K222CQ –  92.3 The Vibe – Rhythmic Contemporary

Killeen/Temple
 KIIZ-FM – Z-92.3 – Mainstream urban
 KSSM – 103.1 Kiss FM – Urban adult contemporary
 KOOC – B-106.3 – Rhythmic contemporary hit radio

Odessa/Midland
 KZBT – B93 – Rhythmic contemporary/Hip Hop

Wichita Falls
 KQXC-FM – Hot 103.9 – Rhythmic Top 40

Corpus Christi
 KZFM – Hot Z-95 – Rhythmic Top 40
 KNDA – 102.9 Da Bomb – Rhythmic Top 40/Hip hop

El Paso
 KPRR – Power 102 – Rhythmic Top 40
KPRR-HD2 - Hot 93.5 - Rhythmic Oldies/Classic Hip Hop

McAllen/Brownsville/Harlingen
 KBFM – 104.1 – Wild 104 – Bilingual Rhythmic CHR
 KKPS - Fuego 99.5 - Bilingual Rhythmic CHR

Tyler/Longview
 KGLD - Gospel 1330 & 104.9 - Urban Gospel (Tyler)
 KBLZ / KAZE – 102.7 / 106.9 The Blaze – Rhythmic contemporary/Hip-Hop
 KISX – 107.3 Kiss-FM – Urban adult contemporary

Lufkin/Nacogdoches
 KZXL - Hot 96.3 - Urban Contemporary

Texarkana
 KTFS - KTOY Gospel 105.9 - Urban Gospel
 KZRB – B103.5 – Mainstream urban
 KTOY – 104.7 KTOY – Urban Adult Contemporary
 KMJI - Majic 93.3 - Urban Contemporary

Waco
 KWBT – 94.5 The Beat – Urban contemporary/Hip-Hop
 KBGO-HD2 - Z-95.1 - Rhythmic Top 40

Jacksonville
 KJTX – 104.5 KJTX – Urban contemporary gospel

San Angelo
 KMDX - 106.1 MDX - Rhythmic contemporary

Utah

Salt Lake City
 KUUU – 92.5 The Beat – Classic Hip Hop/Rhythmic Contemporary
 KBMG - Latino 106.3 - Spanish CHR

Vermont

Burlington
WJMP - Jump 103.7 - Classic Hip Hop

Virginia

Norfolk/Virginia Beach/Newport News
 WGPL – WGPL 1350 AM – Urban contemporary gospel
 WPCE – Peace Radio 1400 AM - Urban contemporary gospel
 WFMI – Rejoice 100.9FM – Urban contemporary gospel
 WHBT-FM – 92.1 The Beat – Old-school hip hop
 WHBT-HD2 - Reggaeton
 WNVZ – Z104 – Rhythmic Top 40
 WMTO-LD/WXTG-FM - Streetz 87.7 & 102.1 - Mainstream urban
 WNSB – Hot 91.1 – Urban adult contemporary
 WOWI – 103 Jamz – Mainstream urban
 WOWI-HD2 – Urban/Street
 WVKL – 95-7 R&B – Urban adult contemporary
 WNOH - Norfolk’s BIN 105.3 - Black-oriented news
 WVBW-FM - 100.5 The Vibe - Urban adult hits

Richmond
 WPZZ – Praise 104.7 – Urban contemporary gospel
 WREJ - Rejoice 101.3/990AM - Urban contemporary gospel
 WBTJ – 106.5 The Beat – Urban contemporary
 WCDX – iPower 92-1/104-1 – Mainstream urban
 WKJS/WKJM – 99.3/105.7 Kiss FM – Urban adult contemporary
 WXGI/WTPS - 99.5/102.7 The Box - Classic Hip Hop
 WQCN-LP - The Choice 105.3FM - Gospel

Roanoke/Lynchburg
 WLLL – Gospel Radio AM930 – Urban contemporary gospel
 WVBE-FM and WVBB – Vibe 100.1 & 97.7 – Urban adult contemporary (FM 97.7 serves Roanoke only)
 WROV-HD2/W244AV - Roanoke’s BIN 96.7 - Black-oriented news
 WJJS/WJJX - 93.5 & 102.7 JJS Rhythmic Top 40

Lawrenceville
 WHLQ - Mix 105.5 - Urban contemporary gospel, Urban oldies, Southern soul

South Hill
 WSHV - 967WSHV - Urban oldies

Charlottesville
 WVAI-LP - 101 Jamz - Urban contemporary

Hampton Roads
 WHOV – 88.1 WHOV – Urban contemporary/Jazz/Black gospel
 WTJZ/W223CT/W285FM - Praise 104.9 - Urban gospel
 WXTG - The Groove - Classic soul/Urban oldies

Pulaski
 WBLB - Family 1340 - Southern gospel/Black gospel

Danville
 WDVA - Black gospel
 WKBY - Inspirational 1080 - Black gospel/Religious

Marion
 WHNK - Praise N’ Glory Radio - Black gospel

Franklin
 WJZU - Praise 99.1FM & 1250AM - Black gospel

South Boston
 WSBV - Black gospel

Washington

Seattle/Tacoma
 KHHO - Seattle's BIN 850 - Black-oriented news
 KYIZ – 1620 - Z-Twins – Urban Adult Contemporary/Urban Talk
 KRIZ – 1420 - Z-Twins – Urban Gospel
 KHTP – HOT 103.7 – Classic hip hop
 KUBE-HD2 - KUBE 93.3 HD2 - Urban Contemporary

Spokane
 KEZE – Hot 96.9 – Rhythmic contemporary hit radio
 KZFS - Hooptown 101.5 - Classic hip hop

Yakima
 KHHK – Hot 99.7 – Rhythmic contemporary hit radio

West Virginia

Charleston
 WRVZ - 98.7 The Beat – Rhythmic contemporary

Martinsburg
 WDLD - Live 96.7 - Rhythmic Top 40

Mount Pleasant
 WTHQ - 94Q FM - Rhythmic Top 40

Wisconsin

Eau Claire
 WEAQ – 95.9 Jamz – Rhythmic contemporary

Madison
 WJQM – 93.1 Jamz – Rhythmic contemporary

Milwaukee
 WGLB - WGLB 1560 AM & 96.1 FM - Urban Gospel
 WJMR-FM – Jammin' 98.3 – Urban adult contemporary
 WKKV – V-100.7 – Mainstream urban
 WNOV – The Voice 106.5 & 860 – Urban contemporary/Community radio
 WXSS HD-2 - Hot 105.7 - Urban Contemporary/Hip Hop
 WGKB - 101.7 The Truth – Black talk
 913ThePlug.com - 91.3 The Plug - Urban Contemporary/Hip Hop/R&B/Internet Radio

Wyoming

Cheyenne
 KARS-FM - Power 102.9 - Rhythmic Top 40/Hip Hop

United States Insular area

American Samoa

Leone
KKBT - 104.7 The Beat - Rhythmic Contemporary

Canada

Toronto, Ontario
CKFG-FM - Flow 98.7 - Urban Contemporary
CHRY-FM - VIBE 105 - Urban Contemporary
CIDC-FM - Z103.5 - Rhythmic Contemporary
CJKX-HD2 - Wave.fm - Smooth jazz/Rhythmic AC

Hamilton, Ontario
CHKX-HD2 - Wave.fm - Smooth jazz/Rhythmic AC

Vancouver, British Columbia
CIWV-FM - Wave 98.3 - Smooth jazz/Rhythmic AC

Guam

Hagåtña
KZGZ (97.5) - Power 98 FM - Rhythmic Contemporary

Northern Mariana Islands

Garapan-Saipan
KWAW - Magic 100.3 - Rhythmic Contemporary

Puerto Rico

San Juan
 WTOK-FM (102.5) – Hot 102 - Rhythmic contemporary
 WPRM-HD2 - Black Information Network - Black-oriented news
 WODA (94.7) - La Nueva 94 FM - Reggaeton/Spanish Urban AC
 WKAQ-FM (104.7) - KQ105 - Bilingual Rhythmic Top 40

Mayaguez
 WNOD (94.1) - La Nueva 94 FM - Reggaeton/Spanish Urban AC
 WUKQ-FM (98.7) - KQ105 - Bilingual Rhythmic Top 40

United States Virgin Islands

Charlotte Amalie
WVJZ - 105 Jamz - Mainstream urban/Reggae
WWKS - Kiss 96.1 - Urban adult contemporary

Christiansted
WJKC - Isle 95 - Urban Contemporary/Reggae
WSTX-FM - FM100 - Reggae
WSTX - AM 970 - Talk/Calypso/Quelbe

Frederiksted
WAXJ - 103.5 The Reef - African-American variety
WDHP - 1620 The Reef - African-American variety
WLDV - 107.9 Da Vybe - Mainstream urban

Satellite radio

Sirius XM Radio

Sirius XM
 XM03 – Venus – Rhythmic contemporary
 XM04 – Pitbull's Globalization Radio – Rhythmic Dance
 XM44 – Hip-Hop Nation – Uncensored Hip-Hop
 XM45 – Shade 45 – Progressive Hip-Hop and Hardcore Hip-Hop
 XM46 – BackSpin – Old School Hip-Hop
 XM47 – The Heat – Mainstream urban
 XM48 – Heart & Soul – Urban adult contemporary
 XM49 – Soul Town – Classic Soul
 XM50 – The Grove – Old School Funk and R&B
 XM64 – Praise – Urban contemporary gospel
 XM141 – HUR – Talk, Urban contemporary
 XM163 – "WGCI" – Mainstream urban

XM
 XM32 – Spirit – Urban contemporary gospel
 XM60 – Soul Town – Classic Soul
 XM61 – The Flow – Neo-Soul (online only)
 XM62 – Heart & Soul – Urban adult contemporary
 XM64 – The Groove – Old-School Funk and R&B
 XM65 – BackSpin – Classic Hip hop
 XM66 – Shade 45 – Uncensored Hip hop
 XM67 – Hip-Hop Nation – Mainstream urban
 XM68 – The Heat – Urban contemporary
 XM163 – "WGCI" – Mainstream urban
 XM168 – The Power – Urban Talk

Sirius
 XS40 – Hip-Hop Nation – Mainstream urban
 XS43 – BackSpin – Old-school hip hop
 XS45 – Shade 45 – Progressive Hip hop
 XS50 – The Heat – Urban contemporary
 XS51 – Heart & Soul – R&B
 XS53 – Soul Town – Classic Soul
 XS67 – Praise – Urban contemporary gospel

List of urban-format radio stations in the United States
List of urban-format radio stations in the United States
List of urban-format radio stations in the United States